The Limey is a 1999 American crime film directed by Steven Soderbergh and written by Lem Dobbs. The film features Terence Stamp, Lesley Ann Warren, Luis Guzmán, Barry Newman, Nicky Katt, and Peter Fonda. The plot concerns an English career criminal (Stamp) who travels to the United States to investigate the recent suspicious death of his daughter. It was filmed on location in Los Angeles and Big Sur.

Critical reception was positive, but the film was not a financial success upon release.

Plot
An Englishman named Wilson travels to Los Angeles to investigate the death of his daughter, Jenny, reported to have died in a car accident, while Wilson suspects murder. Recently released from a British prison, he is a hardened man. Arriving in Los Angeles, he meets Jenny's friends Eduardo and Elaine and questions them. Finding they pass his initial inquiry, he elicits their help in investigating Jenny's death. One suspect who emerges is Jenny's boyfriend, a record producer named Terry Valentine. In investigating him it is learned that in addition to his legitimate record company business, Valentine has involvement in drug trafficking. His involvement is managed through his security consultant, Avery. Wilson locates a warehouse used by the drug trafficker and questions the men there. Laughing at him, they insult his daughter, beat him, and throw him out onto the street. Undeterred, Wilson draws a hidden pistol and returns to the warehouse, shooting dead all but one of the employees. As the survivor flees, Wilson shouts "Tell him ... I'm fucking coming!"

Seeking more information from Valentine, Wilson and Eduardo sneak into a party held at Valentine's house. Once there, Wilson searches for evidence of Valentine's involvement. He finds and steals a picture of Jenny. Attracting suspicion from Avery, Wilson is accosted by a guard whom he swiftly head-butts and throws over a railing to his death. Wilson and Eduardo flee, only to be chased by Avery, who rams their car with his own, gets out of his car and begins shooting at their car. Wilson rams Avery's car in return, forcing Avery to jump out of the way as his car goes over a cliff. He and Eduardo escape but not before Avery hears Eduardo call out Wilson's name.

Back with Elaine and Eduardo, Wilson reminisces about his earlier life with his daughter, whom he remembers only as a child. Worried her father would be sent away to prison, she would often threaten to call the police whenever she found evidence of the crimes he was involved in or planning. He recalls she had never followed through on her threats because she loved him and it eventually became a sad joke between them. However, his life of crime put a strain on his family. He ended up in prison after the men he was involved with sold him out to the police.

Avery hires a hitman, Stacy, to track down and kill Wilson and Elaine. Stacy is prevented from making the hit by agents of the DEA, who have been monitoring Valentine as part of their investigation. Wilson and Elaine are then taken to meet a DEA investigator. The head agent makes it clear the DEA is after the dealer who used Valentine to launder drug money, and that the agents do not intend to interfere with Wilson's personal mission. He lets Wilson see their file on Valentine, including a photograph and address of a second home in Big Sur. Meanwhile, Stacy and his partner, angry at their beating at the hands of the DEA agents, plot to double cross Avery.

Avery moves Valentine to the house in Big Sur, unaware that Wilson now has the address. That night, Wilson enters the grounds. Avery's guards shoot an intruder who turns out to be Stacy and engages in a shootout with his partner, Uncle John, resulting in several deaths and also fatally wounding Avery. Valentine takes Avery's gun away from him and leaves him to die as he flees to the beach with Wilson in pursuit. Betrayed, Avery takes out his spare gun and aims it at Wilson but lowers it, allowing him to pursue Valentine. Valentine shoots at Wilson then falls and breaks his ankle. Unable to escape further, he continues to shoot at the approaching Wilson but misses and after running out of bullets, he begs for his life. Valentine tells Wilson that Jenny found out about his drug ties and threatened to call the police on him (reminding Wilson of what she had done as a child) and in his attempt to stop her Valentine banged Jenny against a wall (he does not reveal that he did this repeatedly), accidentally killing her. In an effort to deflect attention from Valentine, Avery staged the car accident. Wilson knows Jenny would never have turned Valentine in.

He turns away, allowing Valentine to live. Wilson makes his farewells to Elaine and Eduardo and returns to London.

Cast

 Terence Stamp as Wilson
 Lesley Ann Warren as Elaine
 Luis Guzmán as Eduardo Roel
 Barry Newman as Jim Avery
 Peter Fonda as Terry Valentine
 Joe Dallesandro as John "Uncle John", The Hitman
 Nicky Katt as Stacy, The Hitman
 Amelia Heinle as Adhara
 Melissa George as Jenny Wilson
 William Lucking as Warehouse Foreman
 Steve Heinze as Larry, Valentine's Bodyguard
 Nancy Lenehan as Lady On Plane
 Bill Duke as DEA Special Agent-In-Charge
 Michaela Gallo as Young Jennifer
 Matthew Kimbrough as Tom
 John Robotham as Rick

Production

Directing
Steven Soderbergh uses atypical flashback sequences, and includes several scenes (largely without dialogue) from a much older Terence Stamp movie, Ken Loach's 1967 directorial debut Poor Cow. Soderbergh uses the scenes to create a hazy back story to show Stamp's character as a young man, his criminal past, his relationship with Jenny's mother and child Jenny's disapproving attitudes towards his crooked lifestyle. Wilson often speaks in a Cockney rhyming slang. The title refers to the American slang "limey", which refers to Britons.

Editing
Soderbergh and film editor Sarah Flack utilize a variety of unorthodox editing techniques in The Limey. The film frequently features dialogue and background sound from previous or future scenes juxtaposed with a current scene. Dialogue from one conversation, for instance, may find itself dispersed throughout the film, articulated for the first time long after its chronological moment has passed, as a sort of narrative flashback superimposed over later conversation, to complete a character's thought or punctuate a character's emphasis. Background sound may be disjointed in the film and shifted to enhance another scene by suggesting continuation, similarity, or dissimilarity. For example, Wilson is in a hotel room, and turns on the shower, and then Wilson is in an airplane looking out the window, while the shower can be heard.

Release
The Limey was first presented at the 1999 Cannes Film Festival on May 15. It was also featured at the Toronto International Film Festival, the Buenos Aires International Festival of Independent Cinema, and the Hong Kong International Film Festival.

A limited release in the US began on October 8, 1999, and did poorly at the box office. Its first week's gross was $187,122 (17 screens) and the total receipts for the run were $3,193,102. The film was in wide release for seventeen weeks (115 days), and was shown in 105 theaters.

Reception

Critical response
Critical reception of The Limey was largely positive, with the review aggregator Rotten Tomatoes reporting 92% of critics gave the film a positive review, based on 84 reviews, with an average rating of 7.4. The review aggregator Metacritic reported an average rating of 73 out of 100.

Edward Guthmann, film critic of the San Francisco Chronicle, praised the direction and screenplay, and wrote, "The Limey ... is a first-rate crime thriller and further proof that Soderbergh is one of our great contemporary film stylists. Taut, imaginative and complex, this is one of the best American films of the year and a wonderful antidote to the numbing sameness of [some] movies." Critic Janet Maslin wrote of Terence Stamp's work, "Stamp plays the title role furiously, with single-minded intensity, wild blue eyes and a stentorian roar shown off in the film's early moments ... Glimpses of young, dreamily beautiful Stamp and his no less imposing latter-day presence are used by Soderbergh with touching efficacy."

The film critic for Variety magazine, Emanuel Levy, lauded the crime drama and liked the direction of the picture, the acting, and the screenplay, yet thought the film "lacks secondary characters and subplots." He wrote, "The Limey, Steven Soderbergh's new crime picture, continues the helmer's artistic renewal, evident last year in the superbly realized Out of Sight. Pic's most interesting element is the positioning of two icons of 1960s cinema, the very British Terence Stamp and the very American Peter Fonda, as longtime enemies in what's basically a routine revenge thriller ... [and] one has no problem praising the bravura acting of the entire ensemble and the pic's impressive technical aspects. Warren, Guzman and Barry Newman give maturely restrained performances in line with the film's dominant texture. A supporting turn by Joe Dallessandro, Andy Warhol's and Paul Morrissey's regular, accentuates pic's reflexive nature as a commentary on a bygone era of filmmaking."

Roger Ebert of The Chicago Sun-Times gave The Limey 3 stars out of a possible 4. Despite the unusual editing, Ebert described the plot as "basic Ross Macdonald", a reference to the mystery writer whose 1950s and '60s best-sellers set in southern California typically featured doom visited on the young adult children of wealthy parents with dark secrets. Stamp and Fonda, both aging icons of the 1960s, represent different sides of the counterculture: "It is a nice irony that both Valentine and Wilson (the Stamp character) made their money from rock music: Valentine by selling the tickets, Wilson by stealing the receipts of a Pink Floyd concert."

Accolades
Won
 Satellite Awards: Golden Satellite Award; Best Drama Performance by an Actor in a Motion Picture, Terence Stamp; 2000.

References

External links
 
 
 

1999 films
1999 crime drama films
American crime drama films
1990s English-language films
American neo-noir films
American nonlinear narrative films
American films about revenge
Films directed by Steven Soderbergh
Films set in Los Angeles
American independent films
Films scored by Cliff Martinez
Films with screenplays by Lem Dobbs
1999 independent films
1990s American films